Khaliuny Boldbaatar (Mongolian: Халиуны Болдбаатар; born October 20, 1971) is a Mongolian former Olympic judoka.

He competed for Mongolia at the 1992 Summer Olympics in Barcelona at the age of 20, in Judo--Men's Lightweight (71 kg), and came in tied for 7th.

Boldbaatar also competed for Mongolia at the 1996 Summer Olympics in Atlanta at the age of 24 in Judo--Men's Lightweight (71 kg), and came in tied for 5th.

References

External links
 

1971 births
Living people
Mongolian male judoka
Olympic judoka of Mongolia
Judoka at the 1992 Summer Olympics
Judoka at the 1996 Summer Olympics
Asian Games medalists in judo
Judoka at the 1994 Asian Games
Judoka at the 1998 Asian Games
Asian Games gold medalists for Mongolia
Asian Games bronze medalists for Mongolia
Medalists at the 1994 Asian Games
Medalists at the 1998 Asian Games
Universiade medalists in judo
Universiade gold medalists for Mongolia
Medalists at the 1999 Summer Universiade
20th-century Mongolian people
21st-century Mongolian people